Controlled natural languages (CNLs) are subsets of natural languages that are obtained by restricting the grammar and vocabulary in order to reduce or eliminate ambiguity and complexity. Traditionally, controlled languages fall into two major types: those that improve readability for human readers (e.g. non-native speakers),
and those that enable reliable automatic semantic analysis of the language.

The first type of languages (often called "simplified" or "technical" languages), for example ASD Simplified Technical English, Caterpillar Technical English, IBM's Easy English, are used in the industry to increase the quality of technical documentation, and possibly simplify the semi-automatic translation of the documentation. These languages restrict the writer by general rules such as "Keep sentences short", "Avoid the use of pronouns", "Only use dictionary-approved words", and "Use only the active voice".

The second type of languages have a formal syntax and semantics, and can be mapped to an existing formal language, such as first-order logic. Thus, those languages can be used as knowledge representation languages, and writing of those languages is supported by fully automatic consistency and redundancy checks, query answering, etc.

Languages
Existing controlled natural languages include:

 ASD Simplified Technical English
 Attempto Controlled English
 Aviation English
 Basic English
 ClearTalk
 Common Logic Controlled English
 Distributed Language Translation Esperanto
 E-Prime
 Français fondamental
 Gellish Formal English
 Interlingua-IL sive Latino sine flexione (Giuseppe Peano)
 ModeLang
 Newspeak
 Processable English (PENG)
 Seaspeak
 Semantics of Business Vocabulary and Business Rules
 Special English

Encoding
IETF has reserved  as a BCP 47 variant subtag for simplified versions of languages.

See also

 Constructed language
 Knowledge representation and reasoning
 Natural language processing
 Controlled vocabulary
 Controlled language in machine translation
 Structured English
 Word-sense disambiguation
 Simple English Wikipedia

References

External links
Controlled Natural Languages

 
Natural language processing